Robert Birch may refer to:
 Robert H. Birch ( – ), American adventurer, criminal and prospector
 Robert L. Birch (1925–2005), American librarian
 Bob Birch (Robert Wayne Birch, 1956–2012), American musician